H. nobilis may refer to:
 Hippelates nobilis, Loew, 1863, an eye gnat species in the genus Hippelates
 Hypophthalmichthys nobilis, the bighead carp, a freshwater fish species

Synonyms
 Hepatica nobilis, a synonym for Anemone hepatica, the kidneywort, liverwort, pennywort or common hepatica, an herbaceous plant species native to the forest floors of temperate regions of the Northern Hemisphere

See also
 Nobilis (disambiguation)